Joel railway station was the second train station on the Navarre railway line situated 10¼ miles from the beginning of the line along the Avoca railway line. It is located in Victoria, Australia, and was opened in 1914 with Mr. P Foley as its first Stationmaster. The station, or siding was located in what was then known as 'Joel South'. 'Joel Joel', or 'Joel' as it became known was named after Mr.Joel Pennington the manager of a local pastoral station.

The station ceased operation with the closure of the line in 1954.

References

External links 
Postcodes Australia listing
Pictures of Avoca Station
Nevis Postcode

Disused railway stations in Victoria (Australia)